Robert Anthony Krieg (born February 8, 1946, in Hackensack, New Jersey) is a professor of theology at the University of Notre Dame, Indiana.

Education 
 B.A., Stonehill College, 1969
 Ph.D., University of Notre Dame, 1976

Selected bibliography 
 Story-Shaped Christology: The Role of Narratives in Identifying Jesus Christ. Theological Inquiries Series. New York: Paulist Press, 1988.
 Karl Adam: Catholicism in German Culture. Foreword by Cardinal Walter Kasper. Notre Dame: University of Notre Dame Press, 1992.
 Romano Guardini: A Precursor of Vatican II. Notre Dame: University of Notre Dame Press, 1997.
 Catholic Theologians in Nazi Germany. New York: Continuum Books, 2004.
 Treasure in the Field: Salvation in the Bible and in Our Lives. Collegeville: Liturgical Press, 2013.

References

1946 births
Living people
American theologians
University of Notre Dame faculty
Stonehill College alumni
University of Notre Dame alumni